Shafaq Naaz is an Indian television actress and trained Kathak dancer, known for her role of Kunti in Mahabharat and Mayuri in Chidiya Ghar. She is the sister of actors Falaq Naaz and Sheezan Khan.

Career
In 2019, Shafaq acted in web series Halala for Ullu app. In 2022, Shafaq Naaz acted in film X or Y, which was premiered on Disney+ Hotstar. It was conceived and produced by 17-year old Delhi-based filmmaker, Devansh Saraf.

Filmography

Television

Films 

 2017 Guest iin London as Sherry
 2019 Halala as Afza Sayeed
 2019 Mushkil
 2020 Ilzaam as Ragini
 2020 Chitthi as Sonia
 2021 Shukla The Tiger as Urvashi Tripathi
 2022 X or Y as Ritu

References

External links 

 
 

Living people

Place of birth missing (living people)
Actresses in Hindi television
Indian television actresses
People from Meerut
Actresses from Mumbai
21st-century Indian actresses
1992 births